Although prohibited by law, domestic violence in Ecuador is widespread.
Family courts can impose fines for domestic violence, and have the power to remove an abusive spouse from the home. Ecuador has created specialized judicial units under the Ministry of Justice, with judges specializing in family violence. Serious cases of abuse can be referred to the Office of the Public Prosecutor for prosecution.

Extent and social views
The extent of domestic violence is difficult to estimate, due to differing definitions of abuse and due to problems with self reporting in studies. In a 2008 survey, 32.4% of the women interviewed aged 15–49 said they had suffered physical or sexual violence by a current or former partner. 38.2% of the women interviewed justified wife beating in certain circumstances. The most common reason for justification was when the wife "is or is suspected of being unfaithful" with 29.9% of women justifying wife beating in this situation.

Legislation
La Ley Contra la Violencia a la Mujer y la Familia (Law on Violence against Women and the Family) is Ecuador's principal law dealing with domestic violence. In addition, a new Criminal Code came into force in 2014, which also addresses domestic violence.

See also 
 Women in Ecuador
 Crime in Ecuador

References

Violence in Ecuador
Ecuador
Women's rights in Ecuador